Straight Up is an album by the organist Jimmy McGriff, recorded in 1998 and released on the Milestone label.

Reception 

AllMusic's Richard S. Ginell said: "McGriff proves once again that it's never too late to come up with a good record in this vein. And 'good' is understating it; this is a truly great soul-jazz session, possibly the best of McGriff's end-of-the-century renaissance up to this date". On All About Jazz, Douglas Payne noted: "Straight Up isn't perfect. But the variety on display here is nice and the ageless organ master proves he can still grind with a style that's worth hearing"; the site's Ed Kopp observed that "McGriff is one of the most soulful B3 organ players alive, a verity he proves yet again on this fine release". 

In JazzTimes, Patricia Myers wrote that "this issue is a must for fans of both jazz organ and tenor sax".

Track listing
 "Doin' My Thing" (Jimmy McGriff) – 9:19
 "It Had to Be You" (Isham Jones, Gus Kahn) – 5:47	
 "Straight Up" (David "Fathead" Newman) – 7:03	
 "Blues for the Baby Grand" (Rodney Jones) – 6:05
 "It's Your Thing" (Ronald Isley, O'Kelly Isley Jr., Rudolph Isley) – 9:11	
 "Dream" (Johnny Mercer) – 9:03	
 "Brother Griff" (Newman) – 8:08	
 "Oleo" (Sonny Rollins) – 7:09

Personnel
Jimmy McGriff – Hammond X-B3 organ
David "Fathead" Newman, Frank Wess – tenor saxophone, flute
Wayne Boyd – guitar
Bernard Purdie − drums

References

Milestone Records albums
Jimmy McGriff albums
1998 albums
Albums produced by Bob Porter (record producer)
Albums recorded at Van Gelder Studio